Green Hills is a borough in Washington County, Pennsylvania, United States. The borough was formed in 1978 when a local businessman worked to secede from the dry township of  South Franklin after voters there defeated a referendum that would allow alcohol sales at his country club. The population was 20 at the 2020 census, making it the third least populous borough in the state; only S.N.P.J. and Centralia had fewer residents.  Pennsylvania law has since been changed to require at least 500 residents in a newly formed borough.

Geography
Green Hills is located at  (40.113382, -80.299368).

Surrounding neighborhoods
Green Hills is mostly bordered by South Franklin Township; its only other border is with Buffalo Township to the northwest.

Demographics

As of the census of 2000, there were 18 people, 7 households, and 4 families residing in the borough. The population density was 19.5 people per square mile (7.6/km2). There were 8 housing units at an average density of 8.7 per square mile (3.4/km2). The racial makeup of the borough was 100.00% White.

There were 7 households, out of which 3 had children under the age of 18 living with them, 5 were married couples living together, and 2 were non-families. Two households were made up of individuals, and none had someone living alone who was 65 years of age or older. The average household size was 2.57 and the average family size was 3.20.

The median age in the borough was 36 years. Among the 18 residents, there were six children — four girls and two boys — six men, and six women. Of the adults, two were between 18 and 24, four from 25 to 44, three from 45 to 64, and three 65 or older.

The median income for a household in the borough was $94,239, and the median income for a family was $116,250. Males had a median income of $24,583 versus $0 for females. The per capita income for the borough was $124,279. None of the population and none of the families were below the poverty line.

References

Boroughs in Washington County, Pennsylvania